Events from the year 1827 in Spain

Incumbents
 Monarch – Charles IV

Events

Births

Deaths

 * 12 December - María Pascuala Caro Sureda, scholar (born 1768)

References

 
Years of the 19th century in Spain